Mads Bech Christensen (born 3 November 1984) is a Danish professional ice hockey defenceman who is currently playing in Denmark with the Frederikshavn White Hawks. He participated at the 2010 IIHF World Championship as a member of the Denmark men's national ice hockey team.

References

External links
 

Living people
Danish ice hockey defencemen
Frederikshavn White Hawks players
1984 births
People from Frederikshavn
Sportspeople from the North Jutland Region